Hossein Fatemi was an Iranian scholar, journalist and politician.

Hossein Fatemi may also refer to:
 Hossein Fatemi (photographer) (born 1980), Iranian photographer
 Hossein Fatemi (psychiatrist), American-Iranian psychiatrist and professor of psychiatry at the University of Minnesota